Michael or Mike Mullins may refer to:

 Michael Mullins (politician) (born 1953), Irish Fine Gael politician
 Michael J. Mullins (born 1953), English singer and songwriter
 Mike Mullins (rugby union) (born 1970), New Zealand/Irish rugby union player
 Mickey Mullins (born 1968), Irish hurler
 Michael Mullins, actor in the 1976 film  The Pom Pom Girls